Sanka Chathuranga (born 16 February 1996) is a Sri Lankan cricketer. He made his first-class debut on 13 March 2020, for Kalutara Town Club in Tier B of the 2019–20 Premier League Tournament.

References

External links
 

1996 births
Living people
Sri Lankan cricketers
Kalutara Town Club cricketers
Place of birth missing (living people)